Brooks Island Salt Marsh is a wetlands area on Brooks Island in Brooks Island Regional Shoreline a San Francisco Bay Area East Bay Regional Parks District preserve in Richmond, California. The marsh serves as important nesting ground for Caspian terns. Harbor seals have a rookery on the nearby Castro Rocks. The marsh is off limits to visitors all year long and access to the island is restricted to those with a  special permit.

Notes

Landforms of Contra Costa County, California
Geography of Richmond, California
Wetlands of the San Francisco Bay Area
Protected areas of Contra Costa County, California
Marshes of California